Founded in 1986, the International University of Monaco (IUM) is located in the Principality of Monaco. It offers undergraduate and graduate degrees in business specialized in finance, marketing, sport business management and international management, taught in English. Bachelor program at this university consists of 3 academic years. Masters program consists of 1 academic year. Prior to 2002, it was known as the University of Southern Europe.

International memberships
Association to Advance Collegiate Schools of Business (AACSB)
European Foundation for Management Development (EFMD)
Principles for Responsible Management Education (PRME)
The Association of International Educators (NAFSA)
European Council of International Schools (ECIS)

Notable alumni
Jelena Djokovic
David Caprio
Princess Maria Carolina of Bourbon
Andrea Gaudenzi
Marlene Harnois

Notable faculty
Ingo Böbel

References

External links 
International University of Monaco Official Website

Business schools in Monaco
Educational institutions established in 1986
International universities
1986 establishments in Monaco
La Colle, Monaco